Ector County is a county located in the U.S. state of Texas. In the 2020 census, its population was 165,171. Its county seat is Odessa. The county was founded in 1887 and organized in 1891. It is named for Mathew Ector, a Confederate general in the American Civil War.

Ector County comprises the Odessa, Texas, metropolitan statistical area, which is included in the Midland–Odessa combined statistical area.

Geography
Ector County has an average rainfall of about 14 in per year and a warm, sunny, semiarid climate. Most of the county is relatively flat, with small areas of slightly rolling terrain. The area is known for its stark landscape. The few naturally occurring trees are mostly mesquite trees, which more resemble large bushes.

Major highways

Adjacent counties
 Andrews County (north)
 Midland County (east)
 Upton County (southeast)
 Crane County (south)
 Ward County (southwest)
 Winkler County (west)

Demographics

Note: the US Census treats Hispanic/Latino as an ethnic category. This table excludes Latinos from the racial categories and assigns them to a separate category. Hispanics/Latinos can be of any race.

As of the census of 2000, 121,123 people, 43,846 households, and 31,700 families resided in the county. The population density was 134 people per square mile (52/km2). The 49,500 housing units averaged 55 per square mile (21/km2). The racial makeup of the county was 73.69% White, 4.61% African American, 0.83% Native American, 0.64% Asian, 0.04% Pacific Islander, 17.38% from other races, and 2.81% from two or more races. About 42.36% of the population was Hispanic or Latino of any race.

Of the 43,846 households, 38.90% had children under the age of 18 living with them, 54.10% were married couples living together, 13.70% had a female householder with no husband present, and 27.70% were not families. About 24.00% of all households was made up of individuals, and 8.90% had someone living alone who was 65 years of age or older. The average household size was 2.72 and the average family size was 3.25.

In the county, the population was distributed as 30.40% under the age of 18, 10.50% from 18 to 24, 27.90% from 25 to 44, 20.20% from 45 to 64, and 10.90% who were 65 years of age or older. The median age was 32 years. For every 100 females, there were 94.70 males. For every 100 females age 18 and over, there were 90.90 males.

The median income for a household in the county was $31,152, and for a family was $36,369. Males had a median income of $30,632 versus $21,317 for females. The per capita income for the county was $15,031. About 16.10% of families and 18.70% of the population were below the poverty line, including 23.90% of those under age 18 and 14.30% of those age 65 or over.

Communities

Cities
 Goldsmith
 Odessa (county seat)

Census-designated places
 Gardendale
 West Odessa

Unincorporated communities
 Notrees
 Penwell
 Pleasant Farms

Ghost town
 Arcade

Politics

See also

 List of museums in West Texas
 National Register of Historic Places listings in Ector County, Texas
 Recorded Texas Historic Landmarks in Ector County
 Odessa College
 Presidential Museum and Leadership Library
 University of Texas of the Permian Basin
 Odessa Meteor Crater

References

External links
 Ector County government’s website
 Ector County in Handbook of Texas Online at the University of Texas
 Inventory of county records, Ector County courthouse, hosted by the Portal to Texas History
 Ector County Profile from the Texas Association of Counties

 
1891 establishments in Texas
Populated places established in 1891
Majority-minority counties in Texas